The Moldova national futsal team is controlled by the Football Association of Moldova, the governing body for futsal in Moldova and represents the country in international futsal competitions, such as the World Cup and the European Championships
.

Competition history

FIFA Futsal World Cup

 1989 - did not compete
 1992 - did not compete
 1996 - did not qualify
 2000 - did not compete
 2004 - did not qualify
 2008 - did not qualify
 2012 - did not qualify
 2016 - did not qualify
 2020 - did not qualify

UEFA Futsal Championship

 1996 - did not compete
 1999 - did not compete
 2001 - did not compete
 2003 - did not qualify
 2005 - did not qualify
 2007 - did not qualify
 2010 - did not qualify
 2012 - did not qualify
 2014 - did not qualify
 2016 - did not qualify
 2018 - did not qualify
 2022 – TBD

References

External links
Asociatia de futsal din Moldova

Moldova
National sports teams of Moldova
Futsal in Moldova